Chaenophryne draco (smooth dreamer, or smooth-headed dreamer) is a species of dreamer in the family Onierodidae. It is found in tropical and subtropical oceans worldwide at a depth of 350 to 1750 meters.

Description 
Chaenophryne draco is a small fish. Its size range is unknown, but is thought to grow from 8.3 to 12.3 centimeters in length based on two unsexed individuals and one female individual. It has the largest ratio of the number of upper jaw teeth to lower jaw teeth of any species in its genus.

References 
 Sa-a, Pascualita: Chaenophryne draco, fishbase.org, modified by Pablico, Grace Tolentino

Oneirodidae
Fish described in 1932
Taxa named by William Beebe